Hajde da se volimo may refer to:

 Hajde da se volimo (album)
 Hajde da se volimo (film series)